The following highways have been numbered 88:

Australia
 Picton Road, New South Wales

Canada
Alberta Highway 88
 Ontario Highway 88 (former)

France
A88 autoroute

Korea, South
 National Route 88
Gukjido 88

New Zealand
  New Zealand State Highway 88

United Kingdom
A88 road, Scotland

United States
 Interstate 88 (Illinois)
 Interstate 88 (New York)
 Alabama State Route 88
 Arizona State Route 88
 Arkansas Highway 88
 California State Route 88
 Colorado State Highway 88
Florida State Road 88 (pre-1945) (former)
 Georgia State Route 88
 Illinois Route 88 (former)
 Illinois Route 88A (former)
 K-88 (Kansas highway)
 Kentucky Route 88
 Louisiana Highway 88
 Maine State Route 88
 Maryland Route 88
 Massachusetts Route 88
 M-88 (Michigan highway)
 Minnesota State Highway 88 (former)
 County Road 88 (Hennepin County, Minnesota)
 County Road 88 (Ramsey County, Minnesota)
 Missouri Route 88 (former)
Missouri Route 88 (1922) (former)
 Nebraska Highway 88
 Nebraska Recreation Road 88B
 Nevada State Route 88
 New Hampshire Route 88
 New Jersey Route 88
 New Mexico State Road 88
 New York State Route 88
 County Route 88 (Cattaraugus County, New York)
 County Route 88 (Chautauqua County, New York)
 County Route 88 (Dutchess County, New York)
 County Route 88 (Monroe County, New York)
 County Route 88 (Montgomery County, New York)
 County Route 88 (Oneida County, New York)
 County Route 88 (Orange County, New York)
 County Route 88 (Saratoga County, New York)
 County Route 88 (Steuben County, New York)
 County Route 88 (Suffolk County, New York)
 North Carolina Highway 88
 Ohio State Route 88
 Oklahoma State Highway 88
 Pennsylvania Route 88
 South Carolina Highway 88
 Tennessee State Route 88
 Texas State Highway 88 (former)
 Texas State Highway Loop 88 (proposed)
 Texas State Highway Loop 88 (1939–1990) (former)
 Farm to Market Road 88
 Urban Road 88 (signed as Farm to Market Road 88)
 Utah State Route 88
 Virginia State Route 88 (former)
 West Virginia Route 88
 Wisconsin Highway 88

See also
A88